Gregory Edward Butler (born March 11, 1966), is an American former professional basketball player who was selected by the New York Knicks in the 2nd round (37th overall) of the 1988 NBA Draft. A 6'11" center from Stanford University, Butler played in 3 NBA seasons from 1988–1991. He played for the Knicks and Los Angeles Clippers.

In his NBA career, Butler played in 55 games and scored a total of 76 points.

He later played in Portugal for Ovarense Aerosoles.

Butler's older brother, Dave, played for Stanford's rival, California, and later played professionally in Turkey and Japan.

References

External links

1966 births
Living people
American expatriate basketball people in Portugal
Bakersfield Jammers players
Basketball players from Inglewood, California
Centers (basketball)
Los Angeles Clippers players
New York Knicks draft picks
New York Knicks players
San Jose Jammers players
Stanford Cardinal men's basketball players
American men's basketball players